Daniele Resca (born 21 August 1986 in Pieve di Cento, Italy) is an Italian professional target shooter. He won the gold medal in trap at the 2017 World Championships in Moscow.

See also
 ISSF Olympic trap

References

External links
 

1986 births
Living people
Italian male sport shooters
Olympic shooters of Italy
European Games competitors for Italy
Shooters at the 2015 European Games
20th-century Italian people
21st-century Italian people